Bhabhi (Sister-in-Law) is an Indian Hindi language soap opera which aired on Star Plus from 18 March 2002 to 23 May 2008 during weekday afternoons. The series was produced by UTV Software Communications.

Overview
Saroj is forced to assume the mantle of the daughter-in-law and give solace to Tilak's mother. She manages to save her life but is devastated at her loss. The adulation, love and total acceptance from each member of the family numbs her so completely that she decides, for the moment, to accept her position as "Pushpa bhabhi".

Cast

Neha Mehta/Dolly Sohi as Saroj Tilak Chopra / Amisha Vivek Seth
 Manish Goel as Tilak Chopra 
 Bhanujeet Sudan as Nihal
 Puneet Sachdev as Vishal (Vishwa) Chopra
 Tejal Shah / Mandeep Bhandar as Guddo Chopra
 Rakesh Paul / Rushad Rana as Sukhi Uppal
 Rucha Gujarathi as Suhana Seth / Suhana Vishal Chopra / Suhana Dev Thakral
 Eijaz Khan as Sohan, Nihal and Dr. Megha's Son
 Gaurav Khanna as Bhuvan Sareen (Episode 813 - Episode 832)
 Vishal Singh as Dr. Dev Thakral
 Kinshuk Mahajan as Kamal Thakral, Dev and Suhana's Son
 Abir Goswami as Bhairav
 Sharad Kelkar as Advocate Kunal
 Shilpa Shinde as Manju Chatterjee (Before Plastic Surgery) (Episode 198 - Episode 383 & Episode 480 - Episode 671)
 Payal Nair as Manju Chatterjee (After Plastic Surgery) / Meenakshi Chatterjee / Meenakshi Tilak Chopra
 Kanchi Kaul as Suhana Dev Thakral
 Sonia Singh as Sushma (Sush) Vishal Chopra (Episode 840 - Episode 1022)
 Prachi Shah as Seema
 Gurdeep Kohli as Geetanjali Sabharwal / Geetanjali Dev Thakral
 Nazneen Patel as Dr. Megha
 Pooja Bhatia as Rishika Thakral / Rishika Samar Kapoor
 Pariva Pranati as Alpa Seth / Alpa Bhuvan Sareen / Alpa Shubham Chopra
 Joy Sengupta as Tilak Chopra 
 Aashka Goradia as Seema (Episode 342 - Episode 367)
 Mahesh Thakur as Vivek Seth
 Shoma Anand as Reshma Baldev Chopra
 Amit Tandon as Nihal
 Mukul Dev as Tilak Chopra (Episode 452 - Episode 571)
 Rahil Azam / Manav Kaul as Rakesh Chopra
 Dharmesh Vyas / Dharam Taneja as Kukku Chopra
 Neelu Kohli as Nanda Kukku Chopra
 Sunny Moza as Rahul
 Pulkit Nanavati as Dapinder
 Monty Patel as Vicky
 Manmeet Chopra as Raju
 Shivshakti Sachdev as Mehak Thakral
 Yatin Karyekar as Mr. Thakral 
 Niyati Joshi as Savitri Thakral
 Poonam Joshi as Rishika Thakral / Rishika Samar Kapoor
 Tarun Khanna as Samar Kapoor
 Rohit Roy as Raj Malhotra / Devansh Mehra (Episode 321 - Episode 383 & Episode 462 - Episode 516)
 Arundev Sharma as Veeru (Episode 321-Episode 383)
 Mohit Raina as Shubham Chopra
 Swapnil Joshi as Dr. Prakash Thakur
 Raymon Singh as Sunaina Uppal / Sunaina Rakesh Chopra
 Pankaj Berry as Jagdish Uppal
 Prakash Ramchandani as Sudarshan
 Manish Khanna as Advocate Gandhi
 Priyanka Tiwari as Mandira
 Rupali Ganguly as Roshni Prem Khanna
 Puneet Vashisht as Prem Khanna
 Hans Dev Sharma Chamman Laal
 Nimai Bali as Radheshyam
 Mukesh Khanna as Advocate Rathore
 Poonam Gulati as Kamini
 Nikhil Guharoy as Sunil Saxena
 Karishma Randhawa as Soni
 Yashodhan Rana as Siddharth
 Anand Goradia as Tanakesh
 Yusuf Hussain as Dinanath Chopra
 Nikhhil R Khera as Sushma's Boyfriend / Fiancée (Episode 880 - Episode 1010)
 Varun Badola as Varun Badola (Special Appearance)
 Sanjay Mitra

Production
Neha Mehta playing Saroj quit the series on issues with the production house and Dolly Sohi replaced her. Dolly Sohi who quit the series owing her marriage, re-entered the series in January 2007. When Sohi quit, Rucha Gujarati became the lead who also quit in September 2007 when she was to age after a generation leap in story and was replaced by Jayshree Rao.

On 17 August 2006, the series had a special wedding episode with cast from few other StarPlus series then attending the wedding sequence.

References

External links
Official Website

StarPlus original programming
Indian television soap operas
2002 Indian television series debuts
2008 Indian television series endings
UTV Television